This is a list of colonial administrators in the Gold Coast (modern Ghana) from the start of English presence in 1621 until Ghana's independence from the United Kingdom in 1957. In addition to the Gold Coast Colony, the governor of the Gold Coast was for most of the period also responsible for the administration of the Ashanti Colony, the Northern Territories of the Gold Coast Protectorate and the League of Nations/United Nations mandate/trust territory of British Togoland.

Governors of the Gold Coast (1621–1751)

Governors of the Committee of Merchants of the Gold Coast (1751–1822)

Governors of the Gold Coast (1822–1828) 
 Sir Charles MacCarthy, 27 March 1822 – 17 May 1822, first time
 James Chisholm, 17 May 1822–December 1822, first time
 Sir Charles MacCarthy, December 1822–21 January 1824, second time
 James Chisholm, 21 January 1824 – 17 October 1824, second time
 Edward Purdon, 17 October 1824 – 22 March 1825
 Major-general Sir Charles Turner, 22 March 1825 – 8 March 1826
 Sir Neil Campbell, 18 May 1826 – 15 November 1826
 Major Henry John Ricketts, 15 November 1826 – 11 October 1827, first time
 Hugh Lumley, 11 October 1827 – 10 March 1828
 George Hingston, 10 March 1828 – 5 June 1828
 Major Henry John Ricketts, 5 June 1828 – 25 June 1828, second time

Governors of the Committee of Merchants of the Gold Coast (1828–1843) 
 John Jackson, 25 June 1828 – 19 February 1830
 George Maclean, 19 February 1830 – 26 June 1836, first time
 William Topp, 26 June 1836 – 15 August 1838
 George Maclean, 15 August 1838 – 1843, second time

Governors of the Gold Coast (1843–1960) 
In 1843 a governor was appointed subordinate to the Governor of Sierra Leone until 1850. After the Third Anglo-Ashanti War of 1873–74, the Gold Coast was formally declared a crown colony.
 Henry Worsley Hill, 1843–8 March 1845
 James Lelley, 8 March 1845 – 15 April 1846
 William Winniett, 15 April 1846 – 31 January 1849, first time
 James Coleman Fitzpatrick, 31 January 1849 – 13 January 1850
 Sir William Winniett, 13 January 1850 – 4 December 1850, second time
 James Bannerman, 4 December 1850 – 14 October 1851
 Stephen John Hill, 14 October 1851–December 1854
 Henry Connor, December 1854–March 1857, acting
 Sir Benjamin Chilley Campbell Pine, March 1857–April 1858
 Henry Bird, April 1858–20 April 1860, acting
 Edward B. Andrews, 20 April 1860 – 14 April 1862
 William A. Ross, 14 April 1862 – 20 September 1862, acting
 Richard Pine, 20 September 1862 – 1865
 Rokeby Jones, 1865, acting
 William Elliot Mockler, 1865, acting
 Edward Conran, April 1865–February 1867
 Herbert Taylor Ussher, February 1867–April 1872, first time
 John Pope Hennessy, April 1872 – 1872
 Charles Spencer Salmon, 1872–September 1872, acting
 Robert William Keate 7 Mar 1873 – 17 Mar 1873
 Robert William Harley, September 1872–2 October 1873
 Garnet Joseph Wolseley, 2 October 1873 – 4 March 1874
 James Maxwell, 4 March 1874 – 30 March 1874, acting
 Charles Lees, 30 March 1874–June 1874, acting, first time
 George Cumine Strahan, June 1874–7 April 1876
 Charles Lees, 7 April 1876–December 1876, acting, second time
 Sanford Freeling, December 1876–13 May 1878, acting to 5 June 1877
 Charles Lees, 13 May 1878–June 1879, acting, third time
 Herbert Taylor Ussher, June 1879–1 December 1880, second time
 William Brandford Griffith, 1 December 1880 – 4 March 1881, acting, first time
 Sir Samuel Rowe, 4 March 1881 – 29 April 1884
 W. A. G. Young, 29 April 1884 – 24 April 1885
 William Brandford Griffith, 24 April 1885 – 7 April 1895, second time
 William Edward Maxwell, 7 April 1895 – 6 December 1897
 Frederick Mitchell Hodgson, 6 December 1897 – 29 August 1900, acting to 29 May 1898
 W. Low, 29 August 1900 – 17 December 1900, acting
 Sir Matthew Nathan, 17 December 1900 – 9 February 1904
 Herbert Bryan, 9 February 1904 – 3 March 1904, acting, first time
 John Pickersgill Rodger, 3 March 1904 – 19 September 1910
 Herbert Bryan, 19 September 1910 – 20 November 1910, acting, second time
 James Jamieson Thorburn, 21 November 1910 – 29 June 1912
 Herbert Bryan, 29 June 1912 – 26 December 1912, acting, third time
 Sir Hugh Charles Clifford, 26 December 1912 – 1 April 1919
 Alexander Ransford Slater, 1 April 1919 – 8 October 1919, acting, first time
 Frederick Gordon Guggisberg, 9 October 1919 – 24 April 1927
 Sir James Crawford Maxwell, 24 April 1927 – 5 June 1927, acting
 John Maxwell, 5 June 1927–July 1927, acting
 Sir Alexander Ransford Slater, July 1927–5 April 1932, second time
 Geoffry Northcote, 5 April 1932 – 29 November 1932, acting, first time
 Sir Shenton Thomas, 30 November 1932 – 13 May 1934
 Geoffry Northcote, 13 May 1934 – 23 October 1934, acting, second time
 Sir Arnold Weinholt Hodson, 24 October 1934 – 24 October 1941
 Sir George Ernest London, 24 October 1941 – 29 June 1942, acting, first time
 Sir Alan Cuthbert Maxwell Burns, 29 June 1942 – 2 August 1947
 Sir George Ernest London, 2 August 1947 – 12 January 1948, acting, second time
 Sir Gerald Hallen Creasy, 12 January 1948 – 15 February 1949
 Sir Robert Scott, 15 February 1949 – 28 March 1949, acting, first time
 Thorleif Rattray Orde Mangin, 28 March 1949 – 11 June 1949, acting
 Sir Robert Scott, 11 June 1949 – 11 August 1949, acting, second time
 Sir Charles Noble Arden-Clarke, 11 August 1949 – 6 March 1957.

Governor-General of Ghana (1957–1960)
  Lord Listowel, March 1957 – July 1960
In 1957, the Gold Coast Colony, the Ashanti Colony, the Northern Territories of the Gold Coast Protectorate and the British Togoland Trust Territory, became an independent dominion within the British Commonwealth of Nations called Ghana.  The Governor-General of Ghana served as the representative of the Queen of Ghana, whose formal title in Ghana was ‘Her Majesty Elizabeth the Second, Queen of Ghana and of Her other Realms and Territories, Head of the Commonwealth’. The entire dominion formed part of Her Majesty's dominions until the country became a republic in 1960.

See also 

History of Ghana
List of heads of state of Ghana
List of Ghana governments
List of colonial heads of Sierra Leone
Lists of incumbents

References 

 http://www.rulers.org/rulg1.html#ghana
 http://www.worldstatesmen.org/Ghana.html
 http://www.britishempire.co.uk/maproom/goldcoast/goldcoastadmin.htm

Governor of the Gold Coast
Governor of the Gold Coast
Gold Coast